Roger Hobbes (fl. 1413) of Bath, Somerset, was an English politician.

He was a Member (MP) of the Parliament of England for Bath in May 1413.

References

14th-century births
15th-century deaths
English MPs May 1413
People from Bath, Somerset